This article lists the main modern pentathlon events and their results for 2011.

International modern pentathlon events
 July 16 – 24: 2011 Military World Games in  Rio de Janeiro
 Individual winners:  KIM Jin-hee (m) /  Iryna Khokhlova (f)
 Mixed Team Relay winners:  (Jeļena Rubļevska & Sandris Sika)
 October 15 & 16: 2011 Pan American Games in  Guadalajara
 Individual winners:  Óscar Soto (m) /  Margaux Isaksen (f)

World modern pentathlon events
 August 18 – 21: 2011 World Youth "A" Modern Pentathlon Championships in  Istanbul
 Youth Individual winners:  Alexander Kukarin (m) /  Isabel Brand (f)
 Youth Men's Team Relay winners:  (SEONG Jin-soo, Jun Woong-tae, & LEE Min-guk)
 Youth Women's Team Relay winners:  (Ekaterina Makarova, Anastasia Bugrina, & Angelina Marochkina)
 Youth Mixed Team Relay winners:  (Marharyta Maseikava & Aliaksander Biruk)
 Youth Men's Team winners:  (SONG Ho-joon, SEONG Jin-soo, & CHOI Min-gyu)
 Youth Women's Team winners:  (Mayan Oliver, Katia Martinez, & Tamara Vega)
 September 8 – 14: 2011 World Modern Pentathlon Championships in  Moscow
 Individual winners:  Andrey Moiseyev (m) /  Victoria Tereshchuk (f)
 Men's Team Relay winners:  (Róbert Kasza, Ádám Marosi, & Peter Tibolya)
 Women's Team Relay winners:  (Adrienn Tóth, Sarolta Kovács, & Leila Gyenesei)
 Mixed Team Relay winners:  (Victoria Tereshchuk & Dmytro Kirpulyanskyy)
 Men's Team winners:  (Sergey Karyakin, Ilia Frolov, & Aleksander Lesun)
 Women's Team winners:  (Eva Trautmann, Annika Schleu, & Lena Schöneborn)
 November 17 – 22: 2011 World Junior Modern Pentathlon Championships in  Buenos Aires
 Junior Individual winners:  James Cooke (m) /  Sarolta Kovács (f)
 Junior Mixed Team Relay winners: 
 Junior Men's Team winners:  (Hwang Woo-jin, KIM Soeng-jin, & Kim Dae-beom)
 Junior Women's Team winners:  (Kate French, Lydia Rosling, & Freyja Prentice)

Continental modern pentathlon events
 May 19 – 22: 2011 Asian & Oceania Modern Pentathlon Championships in  Chengdu
 Individual winners:  HONG Jin-woo (m) /  Chen Qian (f)
 Mixed Team Relay winners:  (Yang Soo-jin, Lee Choon-huan, & Nam Dong-hoon)
 June 2 – 5: 2011 South American Modern Pentathlon Championships in  Rio de Janeiro
 Individual winners:  Luis Magno (m) /  Priscila Oliveira (f)
 July 13 – 17: 2011 European Youth "B" Modern Pentathlon Championships in  Tata
 Youth Individual winners:  Gregory Flayols (m) /  Pulcherie Delhalle (f)
 Youth Mixed Team Relay winners: 
 July 28 – August 1: 2011 European Modern Pentathlon Championships in  Medway
 Individual winners:  Andrey Moiseyev (m) /  Lena Schöneborn (f)
 Men's Team Relay winners:  (Bence Demeter, Róbert Kasza, & Ádám Marosi)
 Women's Team Relay winners:  (Adrienn Tóth, Sarolta Kovács, & Leila Gyenesei)
 Men's Team winners:  (Ilia Frolov, Sergey Karyakin, & Aleksander Lesun)
 Women's Team winners:  (Leila Gyenesei, Sarolta Kovács, & Adrienn Tóth)
 August 4 – 7: 2011 European Youth "A" Modern Pentathlon Championships in  Székesfehérvár
 Youth Individual winners:  Joseph Evans (m) /  Zsófia Földházi (f)
 Youth Mixed Team Relay winners: 
 September 19 – 25: 2011 European Junior Modern Pentathlon Championships in  Drzonków
 Junior Individual winners:  Bence Demeter (m) /  Sarolta Kovács (f)
 Junior Mixed Team Relay winners:  (Paola Bartoli, Valentin Belaud, Christopher Patte, & Geoffrey Megi)

2011 Modern Pentathlon World Cup
 February 24 – 27: MPWC #1 in  Palm Springs
 Individual winners:  Pavlo Tymoshchenko (m) /  Amélie Cazé (f)
 April 14 – 17: MPWC #2 in  Sassari
 Individual winners:  Ádám Marosi (m) /  Donata Rimšaitė (f)
 Mixed Team Relay winners:  (WU Yanyan & HAN Jiahao)
 May 5 – 8: MPWC #3 in  Budapest
 Individual winners:  David Svoboda (m) /  Aya Medany (f)
 May 26 – 29: MPWC #4 in  Chengdu
 Individual winners:  Lee Choon-huan (m) /  Ekaterina Khuraskina (f)
 Mixed Team Relay winners:  (Tabea Budde & Delf Borrmann)
 July 9 & 10: MPWC #5 (final) in  London
 Individual winners:  Róbert Kasza (m) /  Lena Schöneborn (f)

References

External links
 Union Internationale de Pentathlon Moderne Website (UIPM)

 
Modern pentathlon
2011 in sports